USS Mississippi (CGN-40), a  nuclear-powered guided-missile cruiser, was the fourth ship of the United States Navy named in honor of the 20th state admitted to the Union. Her keel was laid down by the Newport News Shipbuilding and Drydock Company at Newport News, Virginia, on 22 February 1975. She was launched on 31 July 1976. The ship was commissioned on 5 August 1978 by Jimmy Carter, then serving as the 39th president of the United States. Early deployment included escorting the carrier . She also was deployed in 1989 as a response to the capture and subsequent murder of U.S. Marine Corps Colonel William R. Higgins by terrorists.

Ship history

Mississippi (DLGN 40) was laid down on 22 February 1975 at Newport News, Virginia, by Newport News Shipbuilding & Dry Dock Co.; reclassified as a guided missile cruiser and designated CGN 40 on 30 June 1975; launched on 31 July 1976; sponsored by Miss. Janet H. Finch, daughter of Governor Charles C. Finch of Mississippi; and, in ceremonies attended by President James E. [Jimmy] Carter, Jr., Secretary of Defense Harold Brown, and Senator John C. Stennis of Mississippi, was commissioned at Norfolk, Virginia, on 5 August 1978.

Mississippi conducted her shakedown cruise to Caribbean and South American waters (8 January–13 February 1979), then made her first deployment—to the Sixth Fleet in the Mediterranean – (3 August 1981 – 12 February 1982) during a confrontation between the United States and Libya. She operated as part of the screen for aircraft carriers  and  during the Gulf of Sidra incident. Mississippi fired three RIM-66B Standard SM-1 surface-to-air missiles during a live-fire exercise.

Crew 11, a Lockheed P-3C Orion from VP-49, vectored Mississippi to Andalusia and the cruiser rescued all 19 crewmembers. Two Sikorsky Sea Kings from HS-9 operating from Nimitz transferred survivors from Mississippi to the carrier. Mississippi'''s chief engineer and damage control assistant inspected Andalusia but determined that her damage precluded salvage, and the ship sank at 08:24, 1,200 yards off the port bow of the cruiser in 195 fathoms (36°1'N, 12°19'2"E).

On 1 August 1989 Arab terrorists in Beirut, Lebanon, kidnapped and hanged Lt. Col. William R. Higgins, USMC, a member of the UN peacekeeping forces in Lebanon, and threatened to murder additional hostages they held. The carrier  departed early from a visit to Singapore and made for the Arabian Sea, and  steamed from Alexandria, Egypt, to the Eastern Mediterranean as a show of force. Mississippi had deployed as part of the Sixth Fleet's Med 3–89 Battle Force and was visiting Haifa, Israel, when the crisis began. She emergency sortied and operated as the battle group's Composite Warfare Coordinator for anti-surface warfare off the Lebanese littoral throughout the remainder of the month.  had originally been scheduled to participate in Pacific Exercise-89, but sailed to fill a carrier commitment in the Indian Ocean, where she operated until mid-October.Mississippi deployed with the  Battle Group to the Mediterranean for Operations Desert Shield/Storm (16 August 1990 – 28 March 1991). She escorted the carrier , which broke with her conventionally fueled battle group upon exiting the Suez Canal. These two ships travelled at flank speed the length of the Red Sea and through the Bab-el-Mandeb into the Gulf of Aden arriving on (15 January). The importance of that day and break-neck speed to arrive on it was due to uncertainty about Yemen's position on the war, getting the carrier beyond shore batteries and short range patrol boats in the narrow straights was a priority before hostilities could commence on (16 January). Mississippi then waited off the coast of Yemen to escort the engine room troubled  through the Bab-el-Mandeb (18 January) and out beyond the Gulf of Aden. As an ammunition ship, Nitro was needed for battleship shore battery and amphibious landing support. Once escort duty was complete Mississippi made flank speed to her launch position in the northern Red Sea. Mississippi fired three BGM-109 Tomahawk Land Attack Missiles (TLAMs) at Iraqi strategic and military targets (25 January 1991) and two more the following day. One Tomahawk failed after launch and landed in the sea after a short erratic flight. The ship then operated as the local anti-air warfare screen commander for the Red Sea Battle Force (27 January – 24 February).

Following the Haitian Army's overthrow of President Jean-Bertrand Aristide (September 1991), a succession of governments led to sectarian violence. The UN authorized force to restore order and the U.S. initiated Operations Support Democracy and Uphold/Restore Democracy—Uphold Democracy for a peaceful entry into Haiti, and "Restore Democracy" in the event of resistance. Mississippi enforced the embargoes imposed upon Haiti as part of "Support Democracy" (14 July – 3 August). The deteriorating situation then (12 September 1994) prompted the dispatch of a multinational force that included the carriers America and —about 1,800 soldiers of the Army's XVIII Airborne Corps embarked on board Dwight D. Eisenhower. The Haitians agreed to allow the Americans to land peacefully, and (31 March 1995) the U.S. transferred peacekeeping functions to international forces. The crisis marked the first deployment operationally of Army helicopters on board a carrier in lieu of most of an air wing.

NATO and the UN carried out Operations: Provide Promise to provide humanitarian relief for people displaced by the fighting in former Yugoslavia (2 July 1992 – 9 January 1996); Deny Flight to monitor the air space over Bosnia-Herzegovina to prevent the warring parties from using their air strength (12 April 1993 – 21 December 1995); and Sharp Guard to enforce the arms embargo against the combatants (15 June 1993 – 2 October 1996). Mississippi served as Red Crown—coordinating air operations—in the Maverick Operating Area in the Adriatic Sea (2–18 April, 14–21 May, 11–21 June, 30 June – 9 July, 22–27 July, and 22 August–6 September 1995). In addition, the cruiser intercepted Polish vessel Dajti, and her boarding team boarded and inspected the Eastern European ship as a possible smuggler (7 April).

Two Cuban Mikoyan Gurevich MiG-29UB Fulcrums shot down two Cessna 337 Skymasters flown by the "Brothers to the Rescue," a non-profit organization opposed to the Cuban government of Fidel Castro, over contested international waters (24 February 1996). Mississippi led a surface action group that included guided missile cruiser  and guided missile frigate  during Operations Sentinel Lifeguard, Standoff IV, and Escort 1–96 in the Straits of Florida in response to the Cubans' downing the Skymasters (25–28 February and 1–7 March). In addition, the group escorted a civilian flotilla that laid a wreath on the water where the victims fell.

Decommissioning
By 1995 it was determined her nuclear reactors would need to be refueled, but cuts in the Navy budget ruled out the refueling overhaul the ship would need to continue in service. After serving just 18 years in commissioned service, USS Mississippi (CGN-40) was deactivated on 6 September 1996 at Norfolk and was decommissioned and struck from the Naval Vessel Register on 28 July 1997. The ship was prepared and then towed from Norfolk, Virginia, to Bremerton, Washington, via the Panama Canal from March 1998 to May 1998. The MSC fleet tug  executed the initial tow until ex-Mississippi was moored at Rodman Naval Station, Panama.

ex-Mississippi'' entered the Nuclear Powered Ship and Submarine Recycling Program around October 2004 and recycling was completed 30 November 2007.

In 2003, the ship's main mast was installed at the Vietnam Veteran's Memorial in Ocean Springs, Mississippi.

Gallery

See also
Nuclear powered cruisers of the United States Navy

References

External links

  DANFS – USS Mississippi-IV
 
 navsource.org: USS Mississippi
   USS Mississippi CGN-40 Official Crew Website

 

Virginia-class cruisers
Ships built in Newport News, Virginia
1976 ships
Cold War cruisers of the United States
Nuclear ships of the United States Navy